Oste (A 52) is a fleet service ship of the Germany Navy in the Oste-class. It is named after the river Oste which flows throughout northern Lower Saxony.

In 2021, it was approved by the Bundestag, that three new ships would be contracted by Lürssen to be in service by 2027, replacing the class 423.

References 

Ships of the German Navy
Auxiliary ships of the German Navy
1988 ships
Ships built in Flensburg
Oste-class fleet service ships